Colaspis brunnea, the grape colaspis, is a species of leaf beetle from North America. It mainly occurs in the eastern United States. It is a pest of crop such as corn and soybeans, but damage by it has not been documented as economically significant. It is univoltine, and overwinters in the soil as larvae.

The adults are brown-colored (brunnea is Latin for brown) and are around 5 mm in length. The elytra have a series of parallel rows of "puncture" marks. The larvae are scarabaeiform grub with white-grey bodies and orange head capsules, and are between 5 and 6.5 mm long at the 10th instar.

Gallery

References

Further reading

External links

 

Eumolpinae
Articles created by Qbugbot
Beetles described in 1798
Taxa named by Johan Christian Fabricius
Beetles of the United States